Antoine-Claude Fleury (1743-1822), a French historical and portrait painter, studied under Regnault, and exhibited at the Salon from 1795 to 1822. Amongst his works are:
The Abduction of Helen from the Temple of Diana. 1800.
Theseus going to fight the Minotaur. 1804.
The Doom of Orestes. 1806.
Venus and Adonis.
The Origin of Painting. 1808.
Cornelia and her Sons. 1810.
Miss Salisbury. 1812.
The Flight into Egypt. 1819.
The Widow's Mite. 1819.
Portrait of Louis XVIII. 1819.

References
 

1743 births
1822 deaths
French portrait painters
18th-century French painters
French male painters
19th-century French painters
19th-century painters of historical subjects
19th-century French male artists
18th-century French male artists